Simon Nuchtern (born 1936) is a Belgian-born American filmmaker who is based in New York. He has directed, written, and produced a number of low-budget and independent films since the 1960s.

His films include Cowards (1970), a drama which was screened at the Cannes Film Festival; the 3D horror film Silent Madness (1984); and the  action film Savage Dawn (1985), starring Lance Henriksen, George Kennedy, and Karen Black.

Nuchtern was president of August Films (established 1967), a production and post-production company. During the 1970s he was involved in the re-editing of several foreign-shot films prior to their distribution in the United States, notably the controversial  Snuff (1976), which was marketed to exploit rumors of the existence of real-life snuff films. Following the dissolution of August Films in 1989, he founded a smaller-scale film and video production company, Katina Productions.

He is married to artist Anna Thornhill.

Selected filmography

References

External links 

Katina Productions – Nuchtern's production company

Living people
American film directors
American film producers
American people of Belgian descent
1936 births